Pillaiyarkuppam is a village in Bahour Commune of Bahour taluk in the Union Territory of Puducherry, India.  It lies 2 km east of NH-45A.

Geography
Pillaiyarkuppam is bordered by Kudiyiruppupalayam in the west, Kirumampakkam in the north, Bay of Bengal in east and Manappattu in the south.

Road network
Pillaiyarkuppam  is connected to Puducherry by Narambai road which branches off at the 51st km. of NH-45A. Also Pannithittu-Pudukuppam road passes through Pillaiyarkuppam.

Villages
Following are the list of villages under Pillaiyarkuppam Village Panchayat.

 Pillaiyarkuppam
 Kandanpet
 Narambai
 Valluvarmedu

Gallery

Resort

Zest Big Beach, Puducherry
Zest Big Beach, a Mahindra group company, is located at Pillaiyarkuppam beach. It provides variety of adventurous activities.

Politics
Pillaiyarkuppam is a part of Embalam (Union Territory Assembly constituency) which comes under Puducherry (Lok Sabha constituency).

References

External links
 Official website of the Government of the Union Territory of Puducherry

Villages in Puducherry district